is a passenger railway station in the city of Tōgane, Chiba Japan, operated by the East Japan Railway Company (JR East).

Lines

Station layout
Gumyō Station consists of two opposed side platforms. The platforms are short, and can only handle trains with a length of six carriages or less. The station is staffed.

Platform

History
Gumyō Station was opened on November 1, 1911 as a station on the Japanese Government Railways (JGR), which became the Japan National Railways (JNR) after World War II. All scheduled freight operations were discontinued from October 1, 1962. The station was absorbed into the JR East network upon the privatization of the JNR on April 1, 1987.

Passenger statistics
In fiscal 2019, the station was used by an average of 2024 passengers daily (boarding passengers only).

Surrounding area
 
 Josai International University Chiba Togane Campus
 Chiba Prefectural Police Academy
 Chiba Gakugei High School

See also
 List of railway stations in Japan

References

External links

  JR East Station information 

Railway stations in Japan opened in 1911
Railway stations in Chiba Prefecture
Tōgane Line
Tōgane